Thomas A. Steenberg (born 1959) is an American politician. He has served as a Democratic member of the Montana House of Representatives from 2013 to 2017. In August 2021, Steenberg was appointed to replace Bryce Bennett in the Montana Senate.

References

1959 births
Living people
People from Missoula, Montana
Carleton College alumni
Democratic Party members of the Montana House of Representatives